Tokujirō is a masculine Japanese given name.

Possible writings
Tokujirō can be written using different combinations of kanji characters. Some examples:

The characters used for "jiro" (二郎 or 次郎) literally means "second son" and usually used as a suffix to a masculine name, especially for the second child. The "toku" part of the name can use a variety of characters, each of which will change the meaning of the name ("徳" for benevolence, "得" for gain, "篤" and so on).

徳二郎, "benevolence, second son"
徳次郎, "benevolence, second son"
得二郎, "gain, second son"
篤次郎, "sincere, second son"
啄二郎, "peck, second son"

Other combinations...

徳治郎, "benevolence, to manage/cure, son"
徳次朗, "benevolence, next, clear"
得治郎, "gain, to manage/cure, son"
篤次朗, "sincere, next, clear"
竺次朗, "bamboo, next, clear"

The name can also be written in hiragana とくじろう or katakana トクジロウ.

Notable people with the name
, Japanese photographer
, Japanese politician
, Japanese politician and diplomat

Japanese masculine given names